Lake Arbi (also known as Elva Väikejärv) is a  lake in the middle of the town of Elva in southern Estonia.

See also
List of lakes of Estonia
Lake Verevi, another lake in Elva

References

Arbi
Arbi